Kämpfer is a 14-episode Japanese anime series by Nomad, based on the series of light novels written by Toshihiko Tsukiji. The series follows a boy named Natsuru Senō, who is chosen to participate in the Kämpfer battles, giving him the ability to transform into a girl. The anime series aired on TBS between October 2 and December 17, 2009. The series has been licensed for release in North America by Sentai Filmworks and was released in a complete collection by Section23 Films on January 18, 2011. Two additional episodes, titled Kämpfer für die Liebe, were released on Blu-ray Disc and DVD on May 25, 2011, with one of the episodes also airing on April 8, 2011.

Episode list

Kämpfer (2009)

Kämpfer für die Liebe (2011)

References

Kampfer